Julià Guillamon is a Catalan writer and literary critic. He was born in Barcelona in 1962.

Guillamon studied Catalan philology at the University of Barcelona. Since 1994, he has been publishing weekly reviews in the newspaper La Vanguardia. His essays have dealt with the image of Barcelona in literature from the period between the 1970s and the 1992 Summer Olympic Games. He has been the curator of several literary exhibitions. One of his projects, The literature of exile, was staged in Barcelona, Buenos Aires, Santiago de Chile, Mexico City and Santo Domingo in the Dominican Republic. He won the 2002 Serra d'Or Critics' Award for essays and the 2006 Octavi Pellissa Award.

Published books
1989 Joan Perucho i la literatura fantàstica 
1991 La fàbrica de fred 
2001 La ciutat interrompuda. De la contracultura a la Barcelona postolímpica 
2008 Uh, Gabirú 
2008 El dia revolt. Literatura catalana de l'exili. City of Barcelona Prize for essays 2008. Lletra d'Or Prize 2009. 
2009 Monzó: Com triomfar a la vida 
2011 La Mòravia

References

External links
  On the exhibition The literature of exile
  Page dedicated to El dia revolt, Cercle de Lectors 
  Vol a Caracas amb Julià Guillamon, interview by Montse Serra on Vilaweb
  Search for articles by Julià Guillamon in La Vanguardia
  Review of the novel La Moràvia Barcelona Metropolis 2011.

1962 births
Catalan-language writers
Journalists from Catalonia
Spanish writers
Spanish journalists
Writers from Barcelona
Living people
University of Barcelona alumni